Annesley South Junction Halt railway station is a former station on the Great Central Railway on the section from Nottingham Victoria to Sheffield Victoria. The station was opened in July 1923 and closed in September 1962 with it being a short lived station on the line.

Present day
The station has been demolished with the former trackbed and site now part of a footpath with only the rear wall of the signal box remaining but overgrown.

Former services

Sources
Disused stations
Data

Disused railway stations in Nottinghamshire
Former London and North Eastern Railway stations
Railway stations in Great Britain opened in 1923
Railway stations in Great Britain closed in 1962